The Roland Me 109 Replica is a German ultralight and light-sport aircraft, under development by Roland Aircraft of Mendig. The aircraft is an 83% replica of the Second World War Messerschmitt Bf 109 G-6 fighter aircraft and will be supplied as a kit for amateur construction or as a complete ready-to-fly-aircraft.

Design and development
The aircraft was designed to comply with the Fédération Aéronautique Internationale microlight rules and US light-sport aircraft rules. Like the aircraft it replicates, it features a cantilever low-wing, a two-seats-in-tandem enclosed cockpit under a framed canopy, retractable conventional landing gear and a single engine in tractor configuration.

The aircraft is predominantly made from aluminum sheet. The standard engine intended is the  Rotax 912ULS, although consideration is being given to using a  four-stroke powerplant as well.

The plan is to produce the Me 109 Replica under sub-contract in the Czech Republic.

Specifications (Me 109 Replica)

See also
Peak Aerospace Me 109R - a similar replica
W.A.R. BF-109

References

External links

2010s German ultralight aircraft
Homebuilt aircraft
Light-sport aircraft
Me-109
Single-engined tractor aircraft
Low-wing aircraft